Ten-pin bowling took place for the men's and women's individual, doubles, trios, and team events at the 1978 Asian Games in Bangkok, Thailand.

Medalists

Men

Women

Medal table

References

Medalists

External links
 Olympic Council of Asia

 
1978 Asian Games events
1978
Asian Games